is a Japanese actress and voice actress. She was a 7th generation member of Hop Club and a 2nd generation member, number 11, of Idoling!!!. She is best known for playing Kotoha Hanaori/Shinken Yellow in the TV series Samurai Sentai Shinkenger.

Filmography

TV series 
 Samurai Sentai Shinkenger as Kotoha Hanaori/Shinken Yellow ( 2009–2010)
 Kamen Rider Decade as Kotoha Hanaori/Shinken Yellow (2 episodes, TV Asahi, 2009)
 Strangers 6 (WOWOW [2011], Fuji TV [2012], MBC [2012])
 RUN60 (2 episodes, Tokyo MX, 2012)
 Tokumei Sentai Go-Busters as Shelly (2 episodes, TV Asahi, 2012)
 Story of Ishizaka Line as Kashiwazaki Wakako (main role, NHK, 2012)
 Iron Grandma as Aoshima Nana (guest - episode 3, NHK-BS, 2015)
 Kyoto gastronomic taxi murder recipe as Azusa Segawa (EX, 2015)
 Matsumoto Seijo Mystery (guest - episode 11, BS Japan, 2015)
 Ten Dark Women as Natsumi (YTV, 2016)
 Retake as Tachibana Marie (guest; episode 3, THK, 2016)
 Death Note: New Generation (guest; episode 2, Hulu Japan, 2016)
 Megadan ~ wearable Megane-kun (GYAO, 2017)
 Secret × Warrior Phantomirage! (guest; episode 4, TV Tokyo, 2019)

Movies 
 Samurai Sentai Shinkenger The Movie: The Fateful War as Kotoha Hanaori/Shinken Yellow (2009)
 Samurai Sentai Shinkenger vs. Go-onger: GinmakuBang!! as Kotoha Hanaori/Shinken Yellow (2010)
 Mutant Girls Squad as Yoshie (2010)
 Come Back! Samurai Sentai Shinkenger as Kotoha Hanaori/Shinken Yellow (2010)
 Tensou Sentai Goseiger vs. Shinkenger: Epic on Ginmaku as Kotoha Hanaori/Shinken Yellow (2011)
 Mahō Shōjo o Wasurenai as Chika (2011)
 Hankyū Densha (2011)
 Space Sheriff Gavan: The Movie as Shelly (2012)
 The British Rule Attack as Queen Luka (2012)
 Anata no Shiranai Kowai Hanashi Gekijoban (2012)
 Ima, Yari ni Yukimasu as Nao (2012)
 Keitai Kareshi + (Mobile Boyfriend +) (2012)
 Kamen Rider × Super Sentai × Space Sheriff: Super Hero Taisen Z as Shelly, Kotoha Hanaori/Shinken Yellow (2013)
 Saitama Kazoku (2013)
 Live (2014)
 Kagekiha Opera (Extreme Opera) as Takemi Kudo (2016)
 Junpei, Think Again (2018)
 Kishiryu Sentai Ryusoulger The Movie: Time Slip! Dinosaur Panic!! as Museum Guide  (2019)

Video games 
 The 13th Month as The Princess (2022)

Works

Photo albums
 Happy desuu!! (Saibunkan Publishing, December 2007) 
 Hannari Suzuka (Wani Books, October 2009) 
 Su-chan no Lovely Life (July 2010) 
 Natural 18 (Gakken Publishing, December 2010)

DVDs
 Suu-chan to Natsuyasumi (Wani Books, September 2007)
 Happy desuu!! (Saibunkan Publishing, January 2008)
 Mabushi! (Line Communications, April 2008)
 Pure Smile Suzuka Morita (Takeshobo, August 2008)
 Suzuka Morita: Morita no Natsu Monogatari (E-Net Frontier, November 2008)
 Amakuchi Suzuka (Aqua House, March 2009)
 Angelica (Toei Video, July 2009)
 Okibariyasuu (Wani Books, December 2009)
 Driving Suzuka!!! (Takeshobo, May 2010)
 Hana no Shima kara (Line Communications, September 2010)
 Romance18 (Gakken, December 2010)
 Heartfulday (Shinyusha Co., April 2011)
 Tenshi no Kiss (E-Net Frontier, July 2011)
 Summer Color (I-One, October 2014)
 Yume Koi Utsutsu (I-One, July 2015)
 Omoide Horohoro (E-Net Frontier, December 2015)

Stage plays
 Story Girl (Onnanoko)] (April 30 - May 8, 2011)
 Peace Maker (June 3–12, 2011)
 MOTHER ~ tokkō no haha tori hama tome monogatari ~ (Dec 11-15, 2013) 
 Lonely Heart Atom (Feb 5-9, 2014)
 Satoru mo no okite! as Kaoru (May 28 - June 1, 2014)
 Good Morning Ice Person (July 24–27, 2014)
 Kekkon no hensachi II DEAD OR ALIVE (September 10–23, 2014)
 Wedding Dress 2015 (March 5–15, 2015)
 Kuchiduke (October 7–18, 2015) 
 TARO URASHIMA (August 11–15, 2016) 
 Shin Royal (April 27 - May 14, 2017) 
 Digimon Adventure Tri. (August 5–13, 2017)

References

External links 
  
 Official blog (Active since January 1, 2009)

1992 births
Living people
People from Kyoto
21st-century Japanese actresses
Japanese voice actresses
Voice actresses from Kyoto Prefecture
Mausu Promotion voice actors
Japanese idols
Idoling!!! members
Japanese gravure models
Japanese television personalities
Japanese women pop singers
Musicians from Kyoto Prefecture